Sanad Al Warfali (also spelled Al-Ouarfali or ولد القحبه; born 17 May 1992) is a defender who plays for Al-Ittihad and the Libya national football team.

International career

Al Warfali scored his first international goal in a 1–1 draw with Morocco. The match was a 2017 African Cup of Nations qualifier.

International goals
Scores and results list Libya's goal tally first.

References

1992 births
Living people
People from Tripoli, Libya
Libyan footballers
Libya international footballers
Al-Ahli SC (Tripoli) players
Raja CA players
Association football defenders
Libyan Premier League players